Virargues is a commune in the Cantal department in the Auvergne Region in south-central France.

Population

Government
This is a list of mayors of Virargues.

Sights
Saint-Jean-Baptiste Church eleventh century, fifteenth century, sixteenth century
Sainte-Reine Church nineteenth century
The Valley of Allagnon
The Allagnon is a tributary of the Allier

See also
Communes of the Cantal department

References

External links

 Volcano park of Auvergne on the UNEP-WCMC site
 Albepierre-Bredons

Communes of Cantal
Cantal communes articles needing translation from French Wikipedia